Slovenia men's national water polo team represents Slovenia in international water polo competitions and friendly matches, and is governed by the Federation of Water polo clubs Slovenia.

The team participated at the European Water Polo Championship on four occasions. Their highest finish was 11th place in the 1999 edition.

European Championship record
1999 – 11th place
2003 – 12th place
2006 – 12th place
2022 – 16th place

External links 
 Official website 

Men's national water polo teams
National water polo teams in Europe
National water polo teams by country
Water polo men
 
Men's sport in Slovenia